Eddy Sylvestre Negadi (born 29 August 1999) is a French professional footballer who plays as midfielder for  club Pau.

Career
Sylvestre made his professional debut for Nice in a 2–0 loss to Strasbourg on 22 December 2018. He joined Auxerre on a one-year loan in 2019.

In October 2020, Sylvestre signed for Belgian club Standard Liège.

On 15 July 2021, he joined Pau on loan. He returned to Pau on a permanent basis at the end of the season.

Personal life
Born in France, Sylvestre is of Algerian descent.

References

External links
 
 
 
 UNFP Profile

1999 births
Living people
People from Aubagne
French footballers
French sportspeople of Algerian descent
Association football midfielders
Olympique de Marseille players
OGC Nice players
AJ Auxerre players
Standard Liège players
Pau FC players
Championnat National 2 players
Ligue 1 players
Championnat National 3 players
Ligue 2 players
Belgian Pro League players
French expatriate footballers
French expatriate sportspeople in Belgium
Expatriate footballers in Belgium
Sportspeople from Bouches-du-Rhône
Footballers from Provence-Alpes-Côte d'Azur